School Wynd is a street and open space in the centre of Abernethy, Perth and Kinross, Scotland. Running between Main Street in the south and Back Dykes in the north, it is the site of Abernethy Round Tower, a scheduled monument dating to the 18th century. The street is named for the school which formerly operated on it, a building now occupied by Abernethy Museum. 

The village's Category C listed parish church and mercat cross also stand on School Wynd.

See also 

 Wynd

References 

Streets in Scotland